The men's 3000 metres event at the 2019 European Athletics Indoor Championships was held on 1 March 2019 at 13:20 (heats) and on 2 March 2019 at 19:47 (final) local time.

Medalists

Records

Results

Heats

Qualification: First 4 in each heat (Q) and the next 4 fastest (q) advance to the Final

Final

References

2019 European Athletics Indoor Championships
3000 metres at the European Athletics Indoor Championships